Nuculana pernula, or Müller's nut clam, is a marine bivalve mollusc in the family Nuculanidae. It can be found along the Atlantic coast of North America, ranging from Massachusetts to Greenland.

References

Nuculanidae
Molluscs described in 1771